Mikey Kelley is an American voice actor, who is best known for his role as Michelangelo in the TMNT movie, Silver Surfer in The Super Hero Squad Show, David Carter in Invasion America, and Higgins in Elena of Avalor.

Early life
He graduated from Emerson College with a degree in Mass Communication and TV production.

Career
Mikey Kelley landed his first major voice-over job when he was cast as the lead in Steven Spielberg's Invasion America for The WB Network.

He has lent his voice to several animated projects including TMNT, Transformers: Robots in Disguise, Elena of Avalor, Harvey Beaks, Scooby-Doo and the Cyber Chase, The Super Hero Squad Show, Kulipari: An Army of Frogs, Batman: The Brave and the Bold, The Stinky & Dirty Show, Rocket Power, The Land Before Time, The Adventures of Puss in Boots, New Looney Tunes, among others.

On the commercial front, he's worked as a host of several television and radio campaigns.

Kelley has also been featured in a variety of video games including Lego Jurassic World, Halo 3, Tony Hawk's Underground, Ratchet & Clank, Full Spectrum Warrior, Viewtiful Joe, Metal Gear Solid: Portable Ops, Final Fantasy XIII-2, Lego Star Wars: The Force Awakens, as well as many others.

Filmography

Film

Television

Video games

References

External links
 
 

Living people
American male voice actors
Emerson College alumni
American male video game actors
Year of birth missing (living people)